Raphitoma pulchra is an extinct species of sea snail, a marine gastropod mollusc, in the family Raphitomidae.

Description
The length of the shell reaches 8 mm.

Distribution
Fossils of this extinct marine species were found in Miocene strata in Aquitaine, France.

References

 Peyrot, A. (1931) Conchologie néogénique de l'Aquitaine (suite). Actes de la Société Linnéenne de Bordeaux, 83, 5–116, 9 pls.

pulchra
Gastropods described in 1931